Marchese Alessandro dal Borro (22 April 1600 — 2 December 1656, Corfu) was a Tuscan nobleman and general. He became a Field Marshal of the Holy Roman Empire. He was well known for his obesity (which in his time was considered a status symbol).

Early life, family and education 
Alessandro dal Borro was born in Arezzo, the son of Girolamo dal Borro, a captain and a noble from an illustrious family in Arezzo. Alessandro studied mathematics at the University of Florence.

Career
Destined for a military career, he took part in the Thirty Years' War in the ranks of the company of Ottavio Piccolomini, captain for the Grand Duke of Siena, Cosimo II de Medici, sent to Germany to help the emperor Ferdinand II who was his cousin. Del Borro gained many victories on the battlefield, and received for this two baronies and was admitted to the Bohemian nobility.

Alessandro also fought in many campaigns against the Turks and earned the nickname "Terror of the Turks." He fought also in the service of Spain and Venice.

The Grand Duke of Tuscany Ferdinand II de Medici called him back to Florence and named him commander of the army of the Grand Duchy. On 29 July 1643, for services rendered to the Grand Duchy, he gave him the marquisate of Borro.

He returned to the service of the Venetians.

Demise and legacy
Alessandro del Borro died in 1656 in Corfu as a result of wounds received in battle with Barbary pirates. In the management of his estate in Arezzo, he was succeeded by his son Nicholas de Borro (1644–1690) who, like his father, was a career soldier who died in battle.

External links 
 Alessandro dal Borro detto "Il Terrore dei Turchi" (in Italian)

1600 births
1656 deaths
Field marshals of the Holy Roman Empire
Austrian people of the Thirty Years' War
Military personnel of the Thirty Years' War